David Potter may refer to:

 David Stone Potter (born 1957), historian of Greece and Rome at the University of Michigan
 David E. Potter (born 1943), founder of Psion
 David M. Potter (1910–1971), American historian at Yale University
 David W. Potter (born 1948), Scottish sports writer
 Gharlane of Eddore (1947–2001), pen name of David G. Potter
 David S. Potter (born 1925), American politician and businessman
 Dave Potter (politician) (born 1950), California politician, current Monterey County District 5 Supervisor
 Dave Potter (Vermont politician), see Members of the Vermont House of Representatives, 2007–2008 session
 Dave Potter (motorcyclist), English motorcycle racer
 David Potter, American election candidate in Ohio's 13th congressional district